Danilo III (also called Danilo the Younger,  1350–1400) was the fifth Patriarch of the Serbian Orthodox Church (1390–1396), a writer and poet, known also for transferring the relics of Lazar of Serbia from the church of Sveti Spas (Holy Saviour) in Priština to Ravanica in 1391.

Biography
He was a high official of the Serbian Orthodox Church. In 1382, Danilo was the abbot of Drenča Monastery, and from 1390, he replaced Jefrem as Serbian Patriarch. As a retrospective writer, he distinguished himself by including in his works concrete details, dramatic scenes, and dialogues. Danilo III is the author of The Office for Saint Sava, The Office for St. Simeon, The Office for St. Milutin, and the "Narration about Prince Lazar." There are, however, a few literary historian skeptics who question Danilo's authorship of his "Narration" and ascribe it to some anonymous monk from Ravanica Monastery. The "Narration" was written shortly after the Battle of Kosovo, which took place in 1389; and it represents a report of an eyewitness or at least a contemporary of Prince Lazar. It includes many details concerning the situation in Raška the Battle of Kosovo. It was written in 1392 by Danilo III, who was both an eye-witness and a close friend of the royal family. 

The epic story of how Lazar chose an eternal kingdom seems to have originated with Slovo o knezu Lazaru (Narration about Prince Lazar) by Serbian Patriarch Danilo III. Next, Jefimija's embroidered "Encomium to Prince Lazar, and several texts by anonymous monk-scribes, written within thirty years of the battle had solidified his martyrdom. These texts all interpret Prince Lazar's fate at Kosovo as a martyr's victory and the triumph of the commitment to the "heavenly kingdom" over the "earthly kingdom." Folk songs on the same theme have enthralled large audiences over the centuries, particularly Mountain Wreath by Njegoš.

Lazar's speech, like other speeches delivered by princes to their armies before battles, represents evidence of oral literary language  formed by the traditions of oratory. Danilo III brought to life the spoken word of the protagonists and gave vocal and emotional charge to a scene that has great heroic and epic potential. The dramatization of Lazar's speech and the responses of the choir of Serbian warriors can be compared to that of ancient Greek tragedies.  
The Office of St. Milutin is written in the tradition of Orthodox hymnography and it clearly attests to Danilo's poetic talent.

Works
 Služba (acolouthia), to the canonised king Milutin composed around 1380 by Danilo Banjski
 Služba knezu Lazaru (Narration about Prince Lazar)
 Pohvalno slovo o knezu Lazaru
 Povesno slovo knezu Lazaru

See also
 List of heads of the Serbian Orthodox Church

References

1350 births
1400 deaths
Patriarchs of the Serbian Orthodox Church
Serbian writers